Lola L. Cuddy (born 1939) is a Canadian psychologist recognized for her contributions to the field of music psychology. She is a professor emerita in the Department of Psychology at Queen's University in Kingston, Ontario.

Biography 
Cuddy was born in 1939 and grew up in a musical family in Winnipeg, Manitoba. A trained pianist, she completed an undergraduate degree in psychology at United College (now the University of Winnipeg) in 1959, while also earning a diploma in music. She earned a master's degree (1961) and a PhD (1965) in psychology from the University of Toronto, under the supervision of Endel Tulving. In 1965, Cuddy and her husband, Mel Wiebe (a scholar of Victorian literature), left Toronto to accept positions at Queen's University.

In 1969, Cuddy established the Music Cognition Lab at Queen's University, the first music psychology laboratory in Canada and one of the first in the world. Her research program has examined a wide range of topics within music psychology, including melodic expectation, absolute pitch, and effects of musical training. A recent line of research explored music processing among individuals with Alzheimer's disease. This work garnered media attention for the finding that patients with memory loss associated with dementia may be able to maintain musical memories.

Cuddy served as editor of the journal Music Perception from 2002 to 2017, and as a consulting editor to the journals Musicae Scientiae and Psychomusicology. She was the president of the Society for Music Perception and Cognition from 2001 to 2002.

Honours and awards 

 1987: Fellow, Canadian Psychological Association
 2005: David Horrobin Prize for Medical Theory
 2011: Lifetime Achievement Award, Society for Music Perception and Cognition
 2011: Fellow, Association for Psychological Science
 2017: Fellow, Canadian Society for Brain, Behaviour, and Cognitive Science

Selected works

References 

1939 births
People from Winnipeg
Living people
Canadian psychologists
Canadian women psychologists
Cognitive psychologists
Music psychologists
Academic staff of Queen's University at Kingston
Women cognitive scientists
University of Winnipeg alumni
University of Toronto alumni